The Aklanon people are the ethnolinguistic group who lived in the province of Aklan. They are part of the wider Bisaya ethnolinguistic group, who constitute the largest Filipino ethnolinguistic group.

Area
Aklanon form the majority in the province of Aklan in Panay.
They are also found in other Panay provinces such as Iloilo, Antique, and Capiz, as well as Romblon. Like the other Visayans, Aklanons have also found their way to Metro Manila, Mindanao, and even the United States.

History
The Aklanons are descendants of the Austronesian-speaking immigrants who came to the Philippines during the Iron Age. They got their name from the river Akean, which means where there is boiling or frothing.

Minuro it Akean

Aklan, originally known as Minuro it Akean, is considered to be the oldest province in the country and is believed to have been established as early as 1213 b.c.e by Ati King Marikudo. The datus paid King Marikudo a golden saduk (helmet), gold necklace, coloured clothing, and small jewelleries in exchange of acquiring the Panay island ("Government of Aklan," 2019). They then  established the sakup (states) of Hamtik, Akean (which includes the Capiz area), and Irong-irong, cultivated the land, and renamed the new nation as the Confederation of Madya-as (Madjaas). The datus supposedly landed in Malandog, Hamtik, where a marker commemorates the event which is reenacted in the Binirayan (literally, "place where the boats landed") Festival.

Tradition holds that the first ruler of Aklan was Datu Dinagandan who was dethroned in 1399, by Kalantiaw. In 1433, Kalantiaw III formulated a set of laws that is known today as the Code of Kalantiaw. William Henry Scott, a well-known American historian, later debunked the Code of Kalantiaw as a fraud. 
However, many Filipinos, including Aklanons and other Visayans continue to believe this legend as true.

The capital of Akean changed several times. Towards the end of the 14th century, Datu Dinagandan moved the capital from the present Batan, which was captured in 1399 by Chinese adventurers under Kalantiaw. Kalantiaw established then a dynasty but it prematurely ended when his successor, Kalantiaw III, was slain in a duel with Datu Manduyog, the legitimate successor to Datu Dinagandan. When Manduyog became the new ruler, he moved the capital back to Bakan (ancient name of Banga) in 1437. Several datus succeeded Manduyog and when Miguel Lopez de Legaspi landed in Batan in 1565, Datu Kabanyag was ruling Aklan from what is now the town of Libacao.

(These historical vignettes have no historical record as credible basis, but have been manufactured in such a way as to acquire a hint of historical veracity and reinforced among school children primarily through yearly programs or shows supposedly commemorating those historical events. Nonetheless, these vignettes have found no support among the established and respected historians of the Philippines, and are thus relegated as folklore of no historical provenance or significance.)

Spanish Era

During the Spanish era, Aklanons were generally peaceful and did not revolt against Spanish rule in the area. However, the situation changed when two Aklanons, Francisco del Castillo and Candido Iban, joined the Katipunan with the intention of regaining the independence of Aklan along with the rest of the Philippines. Both were successful in ridding the area of Spaniards.

Present

Currently, Aklanons enjoy some form of self-reliance since Aklan is  now a province of the Philippines. Some Aklanons have also been active in Philippine politics, which includes Jose M. Hontiveros from Tangalan, Aklan became Senator representing district of Iloilo, Capiz, and Romblon from 1922-1928 and was appointed  Justice of the Peace, Capiz, Capiz (1913-1916); Provincial Governor of Capiz (1916-1919); Auxiliary Judge, Court of First Instance (1929-1931); Judge of the Court of first Instance, 19th judicial district (1931-1933); and of the 22nd judicial district (1933-1934) and a Delegate representing 3rd District of Capiz in the July 10, 1934 Constitutional Convention.  Dr. Rafael S. Tumbokon, Former Undersecretary of Health, Godofredo P. Ramos, Father of Aklan, Congressman, Governor, delegate to the 1971 Constitutional Convention and Justice of the Court of Appeals and was appointed Foreign Affairs Secretary by President Marcos replacing Carlos P. Romulo but did not materialize – he died of cancer before his appointment is approved; Incumbent Senator Risa Hontiveros, the Grand niece of Sen. Jose M. Hontiveros Alejandro Melchor, Victorino Mapa, and Cardinal Jaime Sin, who was active in the two People Power Revolutions.

Senator Jose M. Hontiveros was never mentioned among the Prominent Aklanons who has been active in politics because during his time as Senator Aklan was just the 3rd Congressional District of Capiz and so he was known to be a Capiznon. But his Birthplace is Tangalan, Aklan (CApiz) to Leon Hontiveros and Genoviva Miraflores on March 19, 1899.

Aklanons are also known throughout the Philippines due to the location of Boracay, one of the major tourist destinations in the country.

Demographics
Aklanons number 559,416 in the Philippines in 2010. They are culturally close to the Karay-a and Hiligaynons. This similarity has been shown by customs, traditions, and language.

Languages
Aklanons speak the Aklan languages, which includes Aklanon and Malaynon. Ati and Kinaray-a are also spoken to some extent. Meanwhile, Hiligaynon is used as a regional language. Aklanon and Hiligaynon are spoken by Aklanons in Metro Manila, while the official languages of the Philippines, Filipino and English are taught at school.

Culture

Most Aklanons engage in agriculture while those in the coastal areas engage in fishing. They also make handicrafts. Music, such as courtship songs or kundiman, wedding hymns, and funeral recitals, are well-developed, as it is with dance.

There are still a lot of Cultural Dances that has never been mentioned by some historians and these dances are the ethnic dance of the Minority groups in the hinterlands of Libacao, Aklan, the barangay Rosal bounding Tapaz, Capiz and this minority group is called the "Pan-ayanon". These dances are the following: Binanog, Panagaytay, Inagong, Sotes, Pahid, Patadyong Dance, and Nigo Dance. Those were the real cultural/Ethnic dance that historians are unaware of.

AS to the name given by the Indigenous People's Satff from Iloilo who went to Libacao and organized it is not acceptable to Libacaonons, "The Tribu Bukidnon"..this Tribu bukidnon never exist in the history of Libacao or Aklan in general. As far as I can remember the Minority group in the hinterlands of libacao is the "Pan-ayanon" who are ethnic Libacaonon and Pan-ay, Tapaz because formerly Pan-ay, Tapaz and Libacao are both part of the Province of Capiz and these are the places where their Tribe used to Live. They have what we called the Minuro as their seat of govt and they have their Chieftains. These Tribe are warlike people having Talibong, Bankaw, Esi, Tara-tara as their weapons and Taming(shield made of wood as their Shield.These people are so artistic. They made their own Silver jewelries like earrings, necklaces as long as 5–6 ft made from US coin silvers and some silver ornaments to the handles of Talibong and Bankaw and they have learned the art of a good Silversmith and those necklaces are being used when they have celebrations and performing the ethnic dances.

The other tribe is the Tag-ilaya who were from the barangays of Oyang and Dalagsaan. The Tag-ilayas has no much culture to tell but only their being warlike and using the same weapons as the Pan-ayanon. These 2 Tribes of the hinterlands of Libacao are clannish people and their main livelihood since time immemorial is the Abaca Fibers. Aklan is one of the producers of Abaca in Region VI and Libacao has almost 90% of it.

Historically, Aklanons practised tattooing, sometimes including henna, but abandoned the practice during the Spanish era. Recently, however, there has been a revival of it in Boracay island, which is caused primarily by its popularity with tourists.

They are among the Filipino ancestries that are tolerant to the Negritos, such as the Ati.

Cuisine
Two main dishes associated with Aklan and Aklanons are Inubaran and Binakol.

Inubaran, is a Filipino chicken stew or soup made with chicken cooked with diced banana pith, coconut milk (gata) or coconut cream (kakang gata), a souring agent, lemongrass, and various spices. The souring agent (called aeabihig) is traditionally either batuan fruits (Garcinia morella) or libas leaves (Spondias pinnata). The name means "[cooked] with ubad (banana pith)", not to be confused with ubod (palm heart); although ubod can sometimes be used as a substitute for ubad which can be difficult to acquire. Variants of the dish can also be made with other types of meat or seafood. It is a type of ginataan.

Binakol, also spelled binakoe, is a Filipino chicken soup made from chicken cooked in coconut water with grated coconut, green papaya (or chayote), leafy vegetables, garlic, onion, ginger, lemongrass, and patis (fish sauce). It can also be spiced with chilis. Binakol can also be cooked with other kinds of meat or seafood. It was traditionally cooked inside bamboo tubes or directly on halved coconut shells.

Literature
The Aklanons have a long tradition in literature with Marikudo as the most notable. Currently, many writers of Aklanon origin, including Melchor F. Cichon, have been trying to introduce Aklanon literature into the mainstream.

Mythology

Like other Western Visayans, Aklanons are known to believe in the aswang. Tales about these creatures are common among Aklanons and superstitions are practised to ward against the danger brought by the aswang. As to this Aswang, which means witch or maybe cannibals are maybe true or not.

See also
Aklanon language
Aklan
 Visayan people
 Boholano people
 Capiznon people
 Cebuano people
 Cuyunon people
 Eskaya people
 Hiligaynon people
 Karay-a people
 Masbateño people
 Porohanon people
 Romblomanon people
 Suludnon
 Waray people
Visayan languages

References

External links
Aklanon
Aklanon Literature (Archived 2009-10-24)
Precolonial Period (of the Philippines) (Archived 2009-10-24)
 BisayaExpats.com - Bisaya Expat Forum

Ethnic groups in Panay
Aklan